Nina Revoyr (born June 12, 1969) is an American novelist and children's advocate, best known for her award-winning 2003 novel Southland. She is also executive vice president and chief operating officer of Children's Institute, Inc., which provides clinical, youth development, family support and early childhood services to children and families affected by trauma, violence and poverty in Central and South Los Angeles.

Early life
Born in Japan to a Japanese mother and a Polish American father, she grew up in Tokyo, Wisconsin, and Los Angeles. After attending Yale University, she taught English in Japan for two years before returning to the United States, where she took an MFA in creative writing at Cornell University. She published her first novel, The Necessary Hunger, in 1997.

Literary work
Mostly rooted in Los Angeles, her work is as much about place as it is about people, the communities and inhabitants most often invisible both in fiction and within the city's margins. The novels reflect a complex, multi-ethnic and ever-evolving L.A., with an eye to the connections and tensions that develop in that proximity.

Race, class, historical context, sexual orientation and politics all play an intrinsic part in Revoyr's fiction: "Not because I'm trying to be politically correct but because that is the world as I know it."  In a 2014 APA interview   she elaborated "By virtue of who the characters are and the situations I put them in, I hope to compel readers to think about issues of race, community, love, family, the things we have in common, and the things that make us different. I hope to complicate and deepen what we think we know about people." In reviewing 2011's "Wingshooters," Booklist spotlighted Revoyr's "unique and affecting exploration of American racism."

While she draws much of her inspiration from urban settings —Watts, Little Tokyo, Hollywood, the Crenshaw District, Glassell Park— Revoyr's work also explores the vastness and unpredictability of the natural world, its power and its restorative possibility. In 2011's Wingshooters, she sets the novel in motion in rural Wisconsin in the 1970s, while looking at race, class and family in the context of small-town attitudes. And while Lost Canyons protagonists are situated in disparate neighborhoods across greater Los Angeles, the Sierra becomes the challenging backdrop thorough which they move.

Several of Revoyr's books (including Southland, Wingshooters, and The Age of Dreaming) are taught and/or frequently used as part of community read programs. Southland, in particular, is taught in many colleges in courses about Los Angeles or California history or literature.

An out lesbian, she has also explored sexual identity and sexual orientation in her work. Relatedly, Revoyr utilizes that prism to examine the myriad of ways people create community and family—sometimes unexpectedly—across racial or cultural lines. Also, conversely, the books also analyze the ways in which tight-knit communities can freeze others out.

Whatever the subject or focus, "I strive to achieve [a] kind of narrative urgency in all of my novels. You want to create that sense of 'What happens next?'" she said in a 2008 interview with novelist Denise Hamilton. "Sometimes readers are more willing to go along with serious social issues and racial themes if the story is compelling."

Social justice and children's advocacy work
Concurrently, Revoyr is executive vice president and chief operating officer of Children's Institute, Inc. a nonprofit which provides clinical, youth development, family support and early childhood services to children and families affected by violence and poverty in Central and South Los Angeles.

Through CII, Revoyr is currently involved in an effort to develop a new child and family service center in Watts, designed by architect Frank Gehry.

Awards and honors
Her 2003 novel Southland won the Ferro-Grumley Award and the 16th Lambda Literary Award in 2004, and was an Edgar Award finalist. It was named as a Book Sense pick, and as one of the best books of 2003 by the Los Angeles Times. It was also named by the LAist as one of the "20 Novels That Dared to Define a Different Los Angeles." Her third novel, The Age of Dreaming, was published in 2008 and was a finalist for the Los Angeles Times Book Prize, and her fourth novel Wingshooters was named one of "Ten Titles to Pick Up Now" by Oprah Winfrey's O magazine, won an Indie Booksellers' Choice Award and Midwest Booksellers Choice Award, was awarded a prize for Outstanding Achievement from the Wisconsin Library Association  as well as a nominee in the Lesbian Fiction category at the 24th Lambda Literary Awards.

Bibliography
The Necessary Hunger (1997)
Southland (2003)
The Age of Dreaming (2008)
Wingshooters (2011)
 Lost Canyon (2015)
 A Student of History (2019)

References

External links

1969 births
American social workers
American women novelists
20th-century American novelists
21st-century American novelists
American lesbian writers
Writers from Los Angeles
Japanese emigrants to the United States
American people of Polish descent
American writers of Japanese descent
Living people
20th-century American women writers
21st-century American women writers
Japanese LGBT novelists
Japanese lesbian writers
Yale University alumni
Cornell University alumni
Lambda Literary Award for Lesbian Fiction winners
American LGBT novelists
American novelists of Asian descent
American women writers of Asian descent
Lesbian novelists
American LGBT people of Asian descent
LGBT people from California